Hugh O'Carolan (in some sources O'Cervallan) was Bishop of Clogher from 1537 to 1557.

The Rector of Donaghmore, he was appointmented by Pope Paul III on 6 August 1535 and consecrated in January 1537. On 1 October 1542 O'Carolan renounced his papal appointment, and was re-appointed by King Henry VIII.

References

Bishops of Clogher (Church of Ireland)
Roman Catholic bishops of Clogher
16th-century Anglican bishops in Ireland
16th-century Roman Catholic bishops in Ireland